Frank Albert Cotton FRS (April 9, 1930 – February 20, 2007) was an American chemist. He was the W.T. Doherty-Welch Foundation Chair and Distinguished Professor of Chemistry at Texas A&M University.  He authored over 1600 scientific articles. Cotton was recognized for his research on the chemistry of the transition metals.

Education
Frank Albert Cotton (known as "Al" Cotton, or "F Albert" on publications) was born on April 9, 1930, in Philadelphia, Pennsylvania.  He attended local public schools before Drexel University and then Temple University.  After earning his BA degree from Temple in 1951, Cotton pursued a Ph.D. thesis under the guidance of Sir Geoffrey Wilkinson at Harvard University where he worked on metallocenes. He received his Ph.D in 1955.

Independent career
Following his graduation from Harvard, Cotton began teaching at MIT.  In 1961, at thirty-one years of age, he became the youngest person to have received a full professorship at MIT.  His work emphasized both electronic structure and chemical synthesis.  He pioneered the study of multiple bonding between transition metal atoms, starting with research on rhenium halides, and in 1964 identified the quadruple bond in the  ion.  His work soon focused on other metal-metal bonded species, elucidating the structure of chromium(II) acetate.

He was an early proponent of single crystal X-ray diffraction as a tool for elucidating the extensive chemistry of metal complexes.  Through his studies on clusters, he demonstrated that many exhibited "fluxionality", whereby ligands interchange coordination sites on spectroscopically observable time-scales.  He coined the term "hapticity" and the nomenclature that derives from it.

In 1962 he undertook the crystal structure of the Staphylococcal nuclease enzyme, solved to 2Å resolution in 1969, published in 1971, and deposited in the Protein Data Bank (PDB code 1SNS) as one of the first dozen protein crystal structures.

In 1972 Cotton moved to Texas A&M University as the Robert A. Welch Professor of Chemistry.  The following year he was named the Doherty-Welch Distinguished Professor of Chemistry.  He also served as the director of the university's Laboratory for Molecular Structure and Bonding.

Pedagogical influence
In addition to his research, Cotton taught inorganic chemistry. He authored Chemical Applications of Group Theory.  This text focuses on group theoretical analysis of bonding and spectroscopy.

Among college students, Cotton is perhaps best known as the coauthor of the textbook Advanced Inorganic Chemistry, now in its sixth English edition.  Coauthored with his thesis advisor, Sir Geoffrey Wilkinson, and now with coauthors Carlos Murillo and Manfred Bochmann, the textbook is colloquially known as "Cotton and Wilkinson."  The text surveys coordination chemistry, cluster chemistry, homogeneous catalysis, and organometallic chemistry.

Cotton served on various editorial boards of scientific journals, including those of the Journal of the American Chemical Society, Inorganic Chemistry, and Organometallics. He chaired the Division of Inorganic Chemistry of the ACS and was an ACS Councillor for five years.  He served on the U.S. National Science Board (1986–1998), which oversees the National Science Foundation, and the Scientific and Technical Advisory Committee of Argonne National Laboratory, and the National Research Laboratory Commission of Texas.

Cotton supervised the thesis research of 116 doctoral students as well as more than 150 postdoctoral associates.

Recognition
Among the awards Cotton received included the U.S. National Medal of Science in 1982, the Wolf Prize in 2000; and the Priestley Medal, the American Chemical Society's highest recognition, in 1998.

In 1995, the Department of Chemistry at Texas A&M along with the local section of the American Chemical Society, inaugurated the annual F.A. Cotton Medal for excellence in chemical research.  A second award named in his honor, the F. Albert Cotton Award for Synthetic Inorganic Chemistry, is presented at the National Meeting of the American Chemical Society each year.

Cotton was a member of the National Academy of Sciences in the United States, and the corresponding academies in Russia, China, the United Kingdom, France, and Denmark, as well as the American Philosophical Society.  He received twenty-nine honorary doctorates.

Run for ACS presidency
Cotton caused a controversy in his run for President of the American Chemical Society for 1984, wherein he mailed a letter to selected members describing his opponent as "a mediocre industrial chemist". Cotton ultimately lost the bid to his opponent Dr. Warren D. Niederhauser of Rohm & Haas.

F.A. Cotton Medal for Excellence in Chemical Research

The F.A. Cotton Medal, established in 1994, is awarded annually by the Texas A&M Section of the American Chemical Society to recognize accomplishments in research rather than distinction of any other sort, no matter how meritorious. The award is sponsored by the F. Albert Cotton Endowment Fund, which was initially raised by Carlos A. Murillo in honor of Frank Albert Cotton, to whom the first medal was awarded in 1995. The recipient receives, in addition to the medal, a bronze replica thereof and a certificate describing the award.

Prizewinners
Source:  Texas A&M Section of the American Chemical Society

1995 F. Albert Cotton, Department of Chemistry, Texas A&M University.
1996 George A. Olah, Department of Chemistry, University of Southern California;
1997 Pierre-Gilles de Gennes, École Supérieure de Physique et de Chimie Industrielles de la Ville de Paris, Collège de France;
1998 JoAnne Stubbe, Department of Chemistry, Massachusetts Institute of Technology;
1999 Alexander Pines, Department of Chemistry, University of California, Berkeley;
2000 Tobin J. Marks, Department of Chemistry, Northwestern University;
2001 Samuel J. Danishefsky, Department of Chemistry, Columbia University;
2002 Ada Yonath, Weizmann Institute of Science;
2003 Gabor A. Somorjai, University of California, Berkeley;
2004 Albert Eschenmoser, Swiss Federal Institute of Technology, Zurich, and Scripps Research Institute;
2005 Richard H. Holm, Harvard University;
2006 Robin M. Hochstrasser, University of Pennsylvania;
2007 Jacqueline K. Barton, California Institute of Technology;
2008 Chi-Huey Wong, The Scripps Research Institute, and National Taiwan University;
2009 Richard N. Zare, Stanford University;
2010 Peter J. Stang, University of Utah;
2011 George M. Whitesides, Harvard University;
2012 R. Graham Cooks, Purdue University;
2013 Brian M. Hoffman, Northwestern University;
2014 K. Barry Sharpless, The Scripps Research Institute;
2015 Douglas C. Rees, California Institute of Technology;
2016 Stephen J. Lippard, Massachusetts Institute of Technology;
2017 Jennifer A. Doudna, University of California, Berkeley;
2018 Harry B. Gray, California Institute of Technology;
2019 A. Paul Alivisatos, University of California, Berkeley;
2020 Carolyn R. Bertozzi, Stanford University; 
2021 (no prize awarded);

Death
Cotton died on February 20, 2007, in College Station, Texas from complications of a head injury he suffered in a fall in October 2006.  He was survived by his wife, the former Diane Dornacher, whom he married in 1959, and their two daughters, Jennifer and Jane.
The Brazos County Sheriff's Department opened an investigation into his death, describing his death as "suspicious".

See also

 List of chemistry awards

References

1930 births
2007 deaths
Members of the French Academy of Sciences
Members of the United States National Academy of Sciences
Foreign Members of the Royal Society
Foreign Members of the Russian Academy of Sciences
Foreign members of the Chinese Academy of Sciences
20th-century American chemists
Harvard University alumni
Inorganic chemists
Texas A&M University faculty
Wolf Prize in Chemistry laureates